Ndanga is a sub-district in Masvingo Province, Zimbabwe and is located 60 km south-east of Masvingo.

The area is easily accessible from the city of Masvingo, as it is lies roughly midway on a highway linking the province's two main cities of Masvingo and Chiredzi. Although the greater Ndanga district is vast, extending as far south as Jerera, it is this original Ndanga area that is home to the district's largest hospital. Not only is Ndanga District Hospital a major hospital in its district, it is also the second major hospital in the whole province. A relatively small business centre, with its sprawling residential area, lies adjacent to the hospital. The community of Ndanga is served by a council school, Chimedza.

Simon R. Ndanga is the chief of Ndanga of which a group of herdmen fall under him around Ndanga. The few neighbouring chiefs are Nhema, Chipinda, Muroyi, Charumbira, of which the half moon chief is with Chief S .R .G. Ndanga.

The Nyabise dam on the Nyabise river supplies  the whole Ndanga area that includes all the neighbouring villages with water, but now the dam is 100% silted since 2000 during Cyclone Eline.

The Ndanga area is surrounded by a number of churches; Roman Catholic, Dutch Reformed Church, Church of Christ, Wesley Methodist, AFM of Zim, ZCC St Engenas led by the late Dr J. J. C. Mawewe.

16 June 2012
Chief S.R.G. Ndanga was involved in a road accident around 9:30am and he later passed on at Masvingo general hospital after being transferred from Ndanga district hospital. Chief was hailed a man of man of honour during his reign as chief and a mass funeral of Bishops, Ministers, Generals and Chief President Charumbira who flew in earlier that morning. As a journalist it was a first time funeral I see such honour all the people I interacted with talked about the man with honour and respect Kraal Headman Machakata, Mataruse, Chikato, Mutanda and other Chiefs. Chief Ndanga's sons Juniors, Eckwell, Saicos, Mazo and Tinashe and sisters are some of the people I interacted with, the eldest grandson Donald. Z. Togarepi he has lost a brother, father in his grandfather. We all waiting to see who will take of the chieftainship of the family. Chief was honoured and praised by the bishop Nehemiah Mutendi on 20 July at DEFE in Gokwe for his outstanding contribution towards the church.

Populated places in Masvingo Province